Silverbird Cinema may refer to:

 Silverbird Cinema (Port Harcourt), Nigeria
 Silverbird Cinema (Uyo), Nigeria
 Silverbird Cinema (Accra), Ghana